The religious affiliations of presidents of Lebanon are a major condition in determining the eligibility candidate. Since the identity of Lebanese population is divided by religion and sects, an unwritten understanding between them resulted in Christians taking the position since its establishment.

Religious affiliations

See also 

 President of Lebanon
 List of presidents of Lebanon

References 

Lebanon
Religion in Lebanon